The Abita River is a  river in southeastern Louisiana in the United States.  It is a tributary of the Bogue Falaya, which flows to the Tchefuncte River and then onto Lake Pontchartrain.

The Abita River rises in central St. Tammany Parish and flows generally west-southwest through central St. Tammany Parish, through Abita Springs, and empties into the Bogue Falaya on the southeast side of Covington.

The length of the Abita River, from headwaters to the mouth, has been designated a "Natural and Scenic River" by the state government of Louisiana.

Variant names and spellings
According to the Geographic Names Information System, the Abita River has also been known historically as:

See also
List of Louisiana rivers

References

Rivers of Louisiana
Rivers of St. Tammany Parish, Louisiana